Green River Park also referred to as Capital Park is set to be a river-like series of large-scale urban parks located in the New Administrative Capital of Egypt.

Prime Minister of Egypt, Mostafa Madbouly said that all 20 neighborhoods in the new capital will be linked to the Green River which is meant to mimic the Nile River's passage through the middle of Cairo.

The Green River focuses on attracting investments, as planned, the park should generate 300,000 new employment opportunities as well as boost Egypt's economic growth as the park will be accepting a capacity of 370,000 visitors/day. As it is also going to be the longest green hub in the world.

Construction 
In 2016, '!melk' and 'EDSA' presented their first idea to both Minister (of Housing and Urban Development) Madbouly and Egypt's President, Abdel Fattah el-Sisi. An idea which has been approved and later unveiled by the Urban Development Consortium and the government to the public.

In January 2019, Egyptian Prime Minister Mostafa Madbouly said that Egypt officially launched the first phase of construction of the Green River project.

Phases of construction 
Construction of the Green River is divided into three phases, and the construction of the first phase is divided into three central/capital parks to match and sync with the entire capital's construction plan. Each phase and park has its own characteristics.

First phase 
The first phase of the Green River (Capital Park) project is divided from east to west into three planning sectors, each of which contains a park with a different focus. It will extend from the central ring road in Cairo to the regional ring road passing through the Central Business Park with an estimated investment of £E 9 billion (US$ 600 million). The construction will be conducted by the Egyptian Ministry of Housing in partnership with Dar al Handasah. It is estimated that the first phase of the park would accept more than 2 million visitors annually, and its construction is expected to take approximately 18 months to be fully finished by June 30, 2021.

Capital Park 1 | History 
It is considered the sector that simulates the environment, and the one that's in harmony with the factors of nature.

Capital Park 2 | Sustainability 
This sector is a considered the center for cultural and entertainment activities. It will also feature jogging trails, multi-sports fields, a wetlands park, a community garden and a group of distinct projects that reflect the characteristics of this part of the Green River.

Capital Park 3 | Civic 
It is the sector that embodies the nature and privacy of public parks, and their close connection with the surroundings. It will include riverfront restaurants, retail shops, a sculpture garden, a ferris wheel, an open library with reading gardens, and a recreational sports club.

Second phase 
Unannounced by the Egyptian government.

Third phase 
Unannounced by the Egyptian government.

Transportation 
The Green River park's infrastructure and transportation systems are both done in a way where all amenities are accessible through a network of pedestrian links, cycle routes, and green bridges. The infrastructure also serves rapid transportation via the inter-city monorail, light rail links and the inner-city tram as well as an electric bus network.

Features 
 The Green River will be open for visits free of charge for the New Administrative Capital, New Cairo and Cairo residents.
 All universities and cities in the new capital are somehow connected to the Green River.
 All districts in the new capital contain green gardens which through residents can reach the main park on foot.
 An integrated network of pedestrian and bicycle paths will allow people of all abilities to enjoy the parks.

Gardens 

The Green River consists of 7 gardens.

 International Park
 Sports Park
 Plants Garden
 Historic Park
 Science Park
 Health and Population Park
 Business and Finance Park

References 

Urban public parks
Parks in Egypt